Timeline is a 2003 science fiction adventure film directed by Richard Donner and starring Paul Walker, Frances O'Connor, Gerard Butler, Billy Connolly, David Thewlis, and Anna Friel. Based on Michael Crichton's 1999 novel of the same name, the screenplay concerns a team of present-day archaeology and history students who are sent back in time to medieval France, to rescue their professor from the middle of a battle.

Jerry Goldsmith composed the original score, which would have been his last before his death in 2004 (his actual last score was Looney Tunes: Back in Action), but it was replaced with a new score by Brian Tyler, after the first cut was re-edited and Goldsmith's increasing health problems prevented him from continuing. The film was poorly received by critics and bombed at the box office, losing an estimated $49 million.

Plot

Professor Edward Johnston leads an archaeological study of the village of Castlegard, near LaRoque Castle in Dordogne, France, the site of the 1357 hanging of Lady Claire, sister to Arnaut de Cervole. Her martyrdom led France to win the Hundred Years War against the English. Johnston's team includes Scottish archaeologist André Marek; Johnston's students Kate Erickson, Josh Stern, and François Dontelle; and his son Chris who is infatuated with Kate. While excavating a nearby monastery, they find a sarcophagus containing the remains of a French knight with a lopped ear, holding the hand of his lady, an unheard-of practice for the time.

Johnston travels to the American headquarters of the ITC Corporation, his project's sponsor, to inquire whether or not they have tampered with the site. The students later discover a lense from Johnston's bifocals and a note begging for help, although both date over 600 years old. When the students contact ITC, the company invites them to its headquarters.

There, the team is introduced to ITC president Robert Doniger and vice-president Steven Kramer. Doniger reveals that in the process of developing teleportation technology, they locked onto a stable wormhole to 1357 Castlegard. Johnston was invited to see the past for himself, but his group has not returned, and they want the students to go back in time to locate him. All but Josh volunteer to go.

The volunteers are stripped of all modern technology save for pendant-shaped markers they can use to initiate their return. The students are joined by a security team including ITC's head of security, Frank Gordon, and two former military men.

On arrival in 1357, the team finds itself in the path of a young woman chased by English knights; the security men are killed while protecting the group, although one activated his marker shortly after priming a grenade. When his body arrives in the present, the grenade detonates and shatters much of the teleportation device. Josh aids Kramer in making repairs.

The team evades the knights, and the woman leads them to the English-controlled Castlegard. They are captured and brought before Lord Oliver de Vannes and his second in command, DeKere. The team members are stripped of their markers, and de Vannes kills François, believing he is a French spy. The others are imprisoned along with Johnston, who is revealed to have promised de Vannes that he can make Greek fire for the English in exchange for his life. They make their escape but are pursued by the English. Gordon and Johnston are recaptured, while the others make for the monastery, led by the woman.

DeKere reveals himself to Gordon and Johnston as former ITC employee William Decker; he had frequently used the teleportation device but was not told by ITC that each use damaged his DNA until it was too late, at which point he would die on a return trip. He plans revenge on ITC and kills Gordon. De Vannes orders his knights to march on LaRoque castle, and DeKere brings Johnston along.

At the monastery, Marek, Kate, and Chris meet de Cervole and realize the woman is Lady Claire; they have changed history by saving her. Marek, who has become infatuated with Lady Claire, is given a horse to rescue his friends. Kate and Chris help to swing the upcoming battle in the French's favor by leading de Cervole's men through the monastery tunnels they had previously mapped to the castle.

As the battle starts, Marek is captured in his rescue attempt; Lady Claire is also kidnapped. Marek manages to free himself, Lady Claire, and Johnston, while Chris helps de Cervole defeat de Vannes. Enraged, DeKere slashes off Marek's earlobe, and Marek realizes he is destined to be the knight in the sarcophagus. Marek defeats DeKere, recovers the markers, gives them to the others, and says his goodbyes as he runs off to help the French assure victory and restore history.

As the three returnees activate their markers, in the present Josh and Kramer have finished the repairs after coming to learn that Doniger has attempted to sabotage their attempts; Doniger fears that when the students' stories become public, ITC will suffer great financial losses. As the machine activates, Doniger races into it, attempting to block the teleportation, but instead he is sent back to 1357, where he arrives outside the castle and is presumably killed by a charging knight.

Chris, Kate, and Johnston safely return. Later, the team returns to the Castlegard ruins, re-examine the sarcophagus, and find that Marek and Lady Claire led a prosperous life after the war and had three children: Christophe, Katherine, and François.

Cast

 Paul Walker as Chris Johnston
 Frances O'Connor as Kate Ericson
 Gerard Butler as André Marek
 Billy Connolly as Professor Edward A. Johnston
 David Thewlis as Robert Doniger
 Anna Friel as Lady Claire
 Neal McDonough as Frank Gordon
 Matt Craven as Steven Kramer
 Ethan Embry as Josh Stern
 Michael Sheen as Lord Oliver de Vannes
 Lambert Wilson as Lord Arnaud de Cervole
 Marton Csokas as Sir William De Kere/William Decker
 Rossif Sutherland as François Dontelle
 Patrick Sabongui as Jimmy Gomez
 Steve Kahan as Baker

Production
The battle sequences used medieval reenactors. Richard Donner limited the use of CGI in the film as much as possible.

Composer Jerry Goldsmith, who had previously collaborated with Donner on The Omen, completed a score for the film - his final score before his death in 2004 - but it was replaced by a different score composed by Brian Tyler after Donner was forced to re-cut the film at the insistence of Sherry Lansing, the then-head of Paramount Pictures. However, both Goldsmith and Tyler's scores were released on CD.

Reception
Timeline performed poorly at the box office, only recouping $43 million worldwide from a budget of $80 million.

Critical response
On Rotten Tomatoes, the film has an approval rating of 13% based on reviews from 144 critics. The site's consensus states: "This incoherently plotted addition to the time-travel genre looks and sounds cheesy". On Metacritic the film has a score of 28% based on reviews from 32 critics, indicating "generally unfavorable reviews". Audiences surveyed by CinemaScore gave the film a grade C+ on scale of A to F.

Kirk Honeycutt of The Hollywood Reporter called it "Glorious so-bad-it's-good entertainment."
Roger Ebert gave it 2 out of 4, and wrote that it was "not so much about travel between the past and the present as about travel between two movie genres" namely "a corporate thriller crossed with a medieval swashbuckler". He was disappointed that the elaborate premise was not put to greater use, that it was essentially nothing more than a frame for action scenes. 
Robert Koehler of Variety wrote: "Lacks the consistent tone, pace and point of view for either a science fiction thriller or medieval war adventure."

References

External links

 
 
 

2003 films
2003 science fiction action films
2000s action adventure films
2000s science fiction adventure films
American action adventure films
American science fiction action films
American science fiction adventure films
Films about time travel
Films based on American novels
Films based on science fiction novels
Films based on works by Michael Crichton
Films directed by Richard Donner
Films produced by Lauren Shuler Donner
Films scored by Brian Tyler
Films set in the 14th century
Films set in France
Films shot in Montreal
Films with screenplays by George Nolfi
Hundred Years' War films
Mutual Film Company films
Paramount Pictures films
Techno-thriller films
2000s English-language films
2000s American films